Lalru is a  town and a Municipal Council In Mohali District about 30 km from Chandigarh, the capital of both Haryana and IndianPunjab, on the Chandigarh-Ambala National Highway, NH 22. Lalru is having one of the toll tax barriers on this Chandigarh - Delhi National Highway.
It is part of Greater Mohali and Chandigarh Capital Region (CCR) or Chandigarh Metropolitan Region (CMR), Which is an area, which includes the union territory city of Chandigarh, and its neighboring cities of Mohali, Zirakpur, New Chandigarh (in Punjab), and Panchkula (in Haryana). Chandigarh Administration, Greater Mohali Area Development Authority (GMADA) and Haryana Urban Development Authority (HUDA) are different authorities responsible for the development of this region.

The economy of the region is interdependent as the area is continuously inhabited, though falling under different states. There is a lot of movement of people and goods daily to and from suburbs, like most of the people working in Chandigarh live in a suburb like Zirakpur. The local industry is on the outskirts like Derabassi, Lalru, and Baddi.
Greater Mohali is an extension of Mohali city and includes the areas of Mundi Kharar, Lalru and Landran. This area comes under Greater Mohali Area Development Authority (GMADA).

History
1987 Lalru bus massacre on 6 July 1987 took place at Lalru in which 38 Hindus were killed by pro-Khalistan Sikh anti-Government militants when a bus was going from Dhilwan in Kapurthala district to Jalandhar was attacked by Sikh militants to drive out the million Hindus living in the state of Punjab and forced the Sikhs living outside of the Punjab state to move in to enable the Sikh separatists to claim the Punjab state as a sovereign country of Khalistan.

Educational Institutes
Pratap Academy
Swami Parmanand Group of Colleges
Universal Group of Institutions
Punjab College of Engineering & Technology (PCET)
Ram Devi Jindal Group of Professional Institutions
Divya Shiksha Gurukul College of Education
Attri College of Education for Girls
Govt. ITI Lalru

See also 
 Lalru railway station
 1987 Punjab killings

References

Punjab, India
Sahibzada Ajit Singh Nagar district